William Graham Boss (1847–1927) was a stained glass designer most noted for his work at the Scottish National Portrait Gallery: a series of stained glass portraits on the main staircase. This was specifically to mark the adaption of the building to accommodate the National Museum of Antiquities from 1891.

Life
He was born in Dunfermline in Fife the son of James Boss (1802-1888) a clerk of works and his wife, Elizabeth Wilkie McLaren (1816-1909). He was a freemason.

From 1875 the family were all living at 11 Lewis Terrace in Edinburgh.

He first appears as a stained glass designer in 1883.

In 1911 he was living at 11 Lewis Terrace in the Dalry Colonies and operated his studio from 16 Union Street at the top of Leith Walk.

He died on 5 September 1927 and is buried with his parents in Warriston Cemetery. The grave lies in a southern section north of the southern path.

Literature
An Inquiry regarding the Boss Family and the name Boss (1902). This is largely a diatribe of letters exchanged with Henry Rush Boss of New York and indeed is the primary contributor to the family history. In this three year exchange WG Boss shows an obsessive desire to be of noble stock, whereas HR Boss writes in a very factual and unpretentious manner.

Public Works
Magdalen Chapel, Edinburgh (1893)
Scottish National Portrait Gallery (1894)

The latter contains stained glass portraits by Boss of the various committee members, namely: John Ritchie Findlay, The Marquess of Bute, Sir Herbert Maxwell, Sir Joseph Noel Paton, Sir William Fettes Douglas, Prof William Turner, Robert Cochran-Patrick, Robert Rowand Anderson, Sir Thomas Dawson Brodie, Aeneas James George Mackay, Reginald MacLeod, James MacDonald, David Christison, Robert Munro, 1st Baron Alness, Joseph Anderson, Thomas Dickson, Sir Arthur Mitchell, Robert Carfrae, Rev Professor John Duns, Gilbert Goudie, Adam B. Richardson, and John Taylor Brown.

References
 

1847 births
1927 deaths
Scottish artists